Al Jawhara bint Ibrahim Al Ibrahim is one of the spouses of King Fahd who ruled the Kingdom of Saudi Arabia between 1982 and 2005 and mother of Prince Abdulaziz.

Background
Al Jawhara Al Ibrahim is a member of wealthy merchant Al Ibrahim family. Her brothers are businessmen, including Waleed bin Ibrahim. One of her sisters, Maha Al Ibrahim, was married to former deputy minister of defense and aviation, Prince Abdul Rahman. Another sister, Mohdi Al Ibrahim, is married to former Saudi minister of higher education, Khaled Al Angari.

Personal life
Al Jawhara Al Ibrahim divorced from her first husband to wed King Fahd. She became the fourth and favorite spouse of him. They had a son, Prince Abdulaziz, who is the youngest child of King Fahd.

After King Fahd experienced a stroke in 1995, limiting his capacity, he became dependent on her, who assisted him with all matters, including public affairs. Her eminence at his side provided her brothers with the opportunity to become influential businessmen, leading to jealousy and gossip in royal circles.

Later life
Following the death of King Fahd in August 2005, Al Jawhara Al Ibrahim remained as an influential and respected member of the royal family, and had close relations with senior royals, especially King Fahd's full brothers - the Sudairi Seven. The fact that she travelled with King Abdallah to Kuwait in January 2007 to pay the family's respects upon the death of the Amir Jabir Al Ahmad Al Sabah was considered to be a sign of her continuing influence.

After King Salman came to power and his son Mohammed became crown prince, they made Al Jawhara vacate her palace home.

References

Jawhara
Jawhara
Living people
Princesses by marriage
Jawhara
Year of birth missing (living people)